Virginia's 31st House of Delegates district election, 2011, held 8 November 2011, was a contest between incumbent Republican Scott Lingamfelter and Democratic challenger Roy Coffey. Coffey argued that legislators should concentrate on spending money on people rather than industries. Lingamfelter argued, "Our nation is in peril. There are people that believe today that the constitution is nothing more than a nice collection of suggestions. Folks, the constitution is not a collection of suggestions it is the law of this land."

Results

See also
Virginia's 31st House of Delegates district

References

2011 Virginia elections